Samantabhadra was a Digambara acharya (head of the monastic order) who lived about the later part of the second century CE. He was a proponent of the Jaina doctrine of Anekantavada. The Ratnakaranda śrāvakācāra is the most popular work of Samantabhadra. Samantabhadra lived after  Umaswami but before Pujyapada.

Life
Samantabhadra is said to have lived from 150 CE to 250 CE. He was from southern India during the time of Chola dynasty. He was a poet, logician, eulogist and an accomplished linguist. He is credited with spreading Jainism in southern India.

Samantabhadra, in his early stage of asceticism, was attacked with a disease known as bhasmaka (the condition of insatiable hunger). As, digambara monks don't eat more than once in a day, he endured great pain. Ultimately, he sought the permission of his preceptor to undertake the vow of Sallekhana. The preceptor denied the permission and asked him to leave monasticism and get the disease cured. After getting cured he again joined the monastic order and became a great Jain Acharya.

Thought
Samantabhadra affirmed Kundakunda's theory of the two nayas - vyavahāranaya (‘mundane') and niścayanaya (ultimate, omniscient). He argued however that the mundane view is not false, but is only a relative form of knowledge mediated by language and concepts, while the ultimate view is an immediate form of direct knowledge. Samantabhadra also developed further the Jain theory of syādvāda.

Works 

Jain texts authored by Acharya Samantabhadra are:
 Ratnakaranda śrāvakācāra (150 verses)- The Ratnakaranda śrāvakācāra discusses the conduct of a Śrāvaka (Jain laity) in detail.
 Gandhahastimahabhasya, a monumental commentary on the Tattvartha Sutra. The Gandhahaslimahahhasya, with the exception of its Manglacharana (salutation to the deity), is extant now. The Manglacharana is known as the 'Devagama stotra' or Āpta-mīmāṁsā.
 Āpta-mīmāṁsā- A treatise of 114 verses, it discusses the Jaina concept of omniscience and the attributes of the Omniscient.
 Svayambhustotra (fifth century CE) - A Sanskrit adoration of The Twenty-four Tirthankaras - 143 verses. It was later translated by Dhyanatray (1676-1726) in Agra.
 Yuktyanusasana- Sixty-four verses in praise of Tirthankara Vardhamāna Mahāvīra
 Jinasatakam (Stutividyā)(116 verses)- Poetical work written in Sanskrit in praise of twenty-four Jinas.
 Tattvanusasana
 Vijayadhavala tika

Praise 
Jinasena, in his celebrated work, Ādi purāṇa praises the Samantabhadra as

References

Citations

Sources 
 
 
 
 
 
 
 

Jain acharyas
Indian Jain monks
2nd-century Indian Jains
2nd-century Jain monks
2nd-century Indian monks